Rubber Heels is a 1927 American silent comedy film produced by Famous Players-Lasky and distributed through Paramount Pictures. It stars stage comedian Ed Wynn in his first motion picture.

Cast
Ed Wynn as Homer Thrush
Chester Conklin as Tennyson Hawks
Thelma Todd as Princess Anne
Robert Andrews as Tom Raymond
John Harrington as Grogan
Bradley Barker as Gentleman Joe
Armand Cortez as 'The Ray'
Ruth Donnelly as Fanny Pratt
Mario Majeroni as Prince Zibatchefsky
Truly Shattuck as Mrs. P. Belmont-Fox

References

External links
Rubber Heels at IMDb.com
 allmovie/synopsis

1927 films
Lost American films
Paramount Pictures films
American silent feature films
1927 comedy films
Films directed by Victor Heerman
Silent American comedy films
American black-and-white films
1927 lost films
Lost comedy films
1920s American films